Roland Goes Digging (in France, Roland fait des Petits Trous) is a 1984 computer game for the Amstrad CPC series of home computers. It was distributed by Amsoft, on cassette tape for CPC464 and Amstrad's proprietary 3" disk format, for CPC664 and CPC6128 users. The game was developed by regular Amsoft contributors Gem Software and featured Amstrad's CPC mascot Roland, who also appears in other games in the Roland Series, such as Roland in the Caves, Roland in Time and Roland in Space.

The game is a clone of Space Panic, with the player guiding Roland along a series of platforms that are reached by ladders; all the while avoiding aliens that prove fatal if he touches them. According to the game's inlay, Roland is employed on a building site that is infested with these aliens and he has been "offered a bonus ... to clear the building of the space squatters". He does this by digging holes in the platforms, into which the aliens will drop, and then dispatching them with his shovel while they are prone. Empty holes are also useful to Roland as a means of accessing lower levels without the use of a ladder.

External links 
 Roland Goes Digging at the CPC Wiki

1984 video games
Amstrad CPC games
Amstrad CPC-only games
Platform games
Video game clones
Video games developed in the United Kingdom
Amsoft games
Gem Software games